Razakeh (also known as Razageh) is a village in Chelav Rural District, in the Central District of Amol County in Mazandaran Province, of Iran. The 2006 census, indicated its population as 1,511, with 375 families.

References 

Populated places in Amol County